The Outtrim railway line is a closed railway situated in the South Gippsland region of Victoria, Australia. It was a  branch of the former South Gippsland railway (also known as Great Southern Railway) and connected with the main line near Korumburra railway station. The line was primarily built to allow the exploitation of black coal deposits in the Outtrim area.

History

The first sod of the Outtrim railway was turned on 6 March 1885. The line was opened in two stages; from Korumburra to Jumbunna on 7 May 1894, and from Jumbunna to Outtrim on 5 February 1896. On 28 October 1892 a short  branch to the Coal Creek coalfield was opened, connecting with the Outtrim line just south of Korumburra station.

The Outtrim line was closed in two stages; on 4 September 1951 from Jumbunna to Outtrim, and on 1 October 1953 from Jumbunna to Korumburra. The closure came at a time when the Victorian government was closing many short branch lines throughout the state.

The Jumbunna railway embankment and
viaduct are listed in the Victorian Heritage Inventory.

See also
List of closed railway stations in Victoria
 Rail transport in Australia
Transport in Australia

References

Closed regional railway lines in Victoria (Australia)
Railway lines opened in 1894
Transport in Gippsland (region)
Shire of South Gippsland